State Route 222 (SR 222) is a  north–south state highway in the southwestern part of the U.S. state of Ohio. The southern terminus of SR 222 is at U.S. Route 52 (US 52) in the village of Chilo.

Route description
The entirety of SR 222 is situated within Clermont County.  No section of this state route is included within the National Highway System (NHS), a network of highways that are deemed most important for the economy, mobility and defense of the nation.

History
The designation of SR 222 took place in 1923.  Originally, the highway was routed from its present southern terminus in Chilo to its junction with the former SR 25 in Monroe Township.  SR 222 was extended to the north in 1937, traveling from SR 125 in Batavia Township to its current northern terminus at US 50.

Major intersections

References

222
Transportation in Clermont County, Ohio